Alena Postlová (later Alena Kvasilová–Postlová, 24 March 1939 – 13 May 2005) was a Czechoslovakian rower. She won the 1962 European Rowing Championships in single sculls. She competed at European Rowing Championships between 1959 and 1970 in single and double sculls. At the 1963 European Rowing Championships in Moscow, she capsized in the final.

References

1939 births
2005 deaths
Czech female rowers
Place of birth missing
European Rowing Championships medalists
Rowers from Prague